The 2001 theAA.com MSA British Touring Car Championship season was the 44th British Touring Car Championship (BTCC) season and marked the beginning of a new era of lower-cost rules and regulations for the series. The season saw a rivalry between Vauxhall teammates Jason Plato and Yvan Muller for the title.

Changes for 2001
2001 saw a complete overhaul of the BTCC, aimed at reducing the cost of competition, improving the quality of racing and making the series more appealing to the fans. The running of the championship was taken over by British Motorsport Promoters (BMP), replacing TOCA who had run the series since 1992.

New regulations
The escalating costs of Supertouring in the late 1990s had seen manufacturers withdrawing as they were no longer able to justify spending the vast amounts of money required to stay competitive and in the British championship in particular independent entries had dropped to an all time low. In 1999 TOCA had begun looking at the next generation of touring car with changes that included simplified aerodynamics, less expensive carbon fibre and more common parts. In June 2000 BMP unveiled plans for the new look formula designed to be "both spectacular and cost effective..." this included allowing manufacturers to use 2 or 3 door cars, no complicated aerodynamics, and standardized parts such as brakes, wheels, gearbox and differential. It also initially stipulated that only front wheel drive cars would be eligible, however this was later changed to allow rear wheel drive cars.

2001 saw the field divided into two classes: BTC-T (Touring class for the new specification cars) and BTC-P (Production for super production based cars, known previously as Class B).

The race format for 2001 was slightly tweaked, there would be three races per weekend - two separate sprint races, one for the BTC-T class and one for the BTC-P class followed by a combined feature race where the BTC-T class would be required to make a 2 tyre stop between 15 and 75% distance as with the previous three seasons. The BTC-P class cars would not be required to stop. In part this format was introduced to allow the BTC-P teams to score and overall victory/podium and not be in the shadow of the BTC-T class. This format was implemented at the opening round however due to the low grid numbers in the BTC-T class (only eight cars completed qualifying) the sprint race was also combined for the remainder of the season. In order for BTC-P teams to still challenge for an overall victory they would have to complete one less lap, BTC-T teams would start first then after a time delay that varied depending on track length the BTC-P teams got the green light. The BTC-T teams would have to catch and effectively un-lap themselves which created a tortoise and hare style race. Across the season the sprint victories were evenly mixed with seven 'outright' victories for the BTC-P class.

However both classes had their own points system so this made no difference in terms of the championship and it was seen as unnecessarily confusing to the casual fan and was ultimately dropped for 2002.

Teams and driver information

BTC-Touring

The new rules provoked different reactions from the three remaining manufacturers in the BTCC.  Ford withdrew completely, whereas Honda took a year out to develop a car to the new rules. Vauxhall immediately set to work on a new car and entered four new-regulation Astra Coupes built and run by Triple 8 Racing.

Yvan Muller and Jason Plato remained in first two entries under the Vauxhall Motorsport banner, while James Thompson moved from Honda to partner Phil Bennett, debuting in the BTCC, in Egg Sport-liveried cars. Bennett received a race ban after five separate incidents at Croft for the sprint race at the following round but wouldn't compete in the feature race either as Vauxhall chose to withdraw him from the weekend. Formula 3 racer Andy Priaulx took over his seat for the two races.

Peugeot re-entered the series with a trio of Vic Lee Racing-prepared 406 Coupes driven by Matt Neal (who left after the first round to compete in the European Touring Car Championship for Team Dynamics), Class B graduate Dan Eaves and touring car veteran Steve Soper. The team re-expanded to three cars for Donington, as superbike racer Aaron Slight made a guest appearance whilst evaluating a full-time switch to four wheels the following year. MG began development of a pair of ZS' built to the new regulations courtesy of West Surrey Racing, these made guest appearances in the hands of ex-Ford and Nissan driver Anthony Reid and former Formula 3 and STW racer Warren Hughes during closing rounds of the season in preparation for a full campaign in 2002.

Two small independent teams filled out the Touring class grid ambitiously entering new cars: JSM fielded a pair of Alfa Romeo 147s in an assault headed by 1992 BTCC champion Tim Harvey in a driver/team manager role. It was planned for Harvey to drive the car when Tom Ferrier was fulfilling other driving commitments in the European Super Production Championship. The second car was driven by David Pinkney until he walked away from the team after the Silverstone rounds in June which would see Harvey take over and drive alongside Ferrier. Former independent driver Mark Blair competed in two rounds in place of Ferrier later in the year.

ABG Motorsport entered a Lexus IS200 for Kurt Luby, with plans to expand to a second car for Brazilian GT racer Thomas Erdos later in the year.  This did not come off and instead Erdos took Luby's drive mid-season when the Englishman walked away from the team, while the running of the car was taken over by Total Motorsport. Driver-turned-motoring journalist Steve Sutcliffe drove the car as a guest entry in the final round.

BTC-Production
With a low entry in the top class, the grid relied largely on the super production specification base Production class (formerly Class B) to boost grid numbers in this transitional year.

HTML headed the Peugeot entry with Roger Moen and Simon Harrison moving across from the National Saloon Cup, Tech-Speed Motorsport also entered a pair of 306s for MG-F racers Annie Templeton and young gun Paul O'Neill, and teenager Tom Boardman drove a fifth 306 for his family-run team.

Barwell Motorsport fielded a pair of Honda Accords for former works Honda driver 2000 Class B runner up James Kaye  and Peter Cate who was replaced by Simon Graves following the first three rounds. Tiff Needell appeared in the second car at Oulton Park in August but was ineligible for points. There were also Accords for Total Control Racing's Jim Edwards Jnr and Synchro Motorsport's Dave Allan. Mark Lemmer raced in place of Allan at Croft and Snetterton.

The Honda contingent was also bolstered by businessman John Batchelor's pair of B&Q-backed Integras, entered for himself (as John B-and-Q) and Nick Beaumont. Joanna Clarke raced in place of Batchelor for three rounds mid season. Nick James also appeared for a handful of rounds in the Integra he raced in the second half of 2000.

The Ford Focus was also competitive in the hands of GR Motorsport, who entered a quartet of cars for youngsters Gareth Howell and Mat Jackson, and veterans Rick Kraemer and Richard Meins. Mein's car was taken over by future champion Gordon Shedden for the Knockhill races.

GA Janspeed entered two Alfa Romeo 156's, campaigned by Gavin Pyper and Colin Blair and Rob Collard returned now driving a self-entered Renault Clio.

Cranfield Automotive fielded a pair of Mitsubishi Carismas for reigning National Saloon champion Toni Ruokonen and Andy Neate with James Levy driving at Oulton Park. They, along with Bintcliffe Sport running a single Nissan Primera for Matt Kelly, abandoned their efforts early in the year.  Later in the season the first Proton entered in the BTCC, a Satria run by TH Motorsport for Steve Wood, appeared at Silverstone and Brands Hatch

Other changes
Alan Gow stepped down as the series boss, replaced by Richard West.
BF Goodrich replaced Michelin as the control tyre for the series.
Honda and Ford left the series, although Peugeot returned as a works entry after withdrawing at the end of the 1998 season.
The independents trophy was not implemented during the season.
More conventional qualifying sessions returned, replacing the one-lap showdown system of previous years
The first race held outside of the United Kingdom took place in June when the championship visited Mondello Park in Ireland.

Teams and drivers

† Not eligible for points.

There was no Independent Cup in 2001.

Race calendar and winners
All races were held in the United Kingdom (excepting Mondello Park round that held in Ireland).

† Both classes had their own separate races.

Championship results tables

No driver may collect more than one "Lead a Lap" point per race no matter how many laps they lead.
Any Production class drivers who lead in their class for at least a lap will get awarded a point.

Drivers' Championship
(key)

Note: bold signifies pole position in class (1 point awarded all races), italics signifies fastest lap in class (1 point awarded all races) and * signifies that driver lead feature race for at least one lap and also in the Production class when a driver leads the class for at least a lap (1 point given in both).
† Not eligible for points

Manufacturers Championship

Touring Teams Championship

† Not eligible for points

Production Teams Championship

References

External links

British Touring Car Championship seasons
Touring Car Championship